Bernard Roy Heighes (16 January 1947 – 6 January 2017) was an English cricketer.

References

External links
Bernard Heighes at ESPNcricinfo

1947 births
2017 deaths
English cricketers
People from Chiswick
Marylebone Cricket Club cricketers